Two vessels of the Royal Navy have been named HMS Moselle after the Moselle river:
  was a French 24-gun sloop captured by the British at Toulon. She was recaptured by the French in January 1794 and captured again by the British four months later. She was added to the Royal Navy as a sixth rate before being sold in September 1802.
  was an 18-gun  brig-sloop commissioned into the Royal Navy in 1804 and sold at Deptford in December 1815.

References

 

Royal Navy ship names